Selmania minima is a species of leaf beetle. It is distributed in the Democratic Republic of the Congo and Sudan. It was first described by the Belgian entomologist  in 1942, from specimens collected by Gaston-François de Witte from the Albert National Park between 1933 and 1935. Host plants for the species include Combretum binderianum.

References 

Eumolpinae
Beetles of the Democratic Republic of the Congo
Insects of Sudan
Beetles described in 1942